Rishi Bankim Chandra Colleges are a group of three co-located general degree colleges located in Naihati, West Bengal, India, namely Rishi Bankim Chandra College for Women, operating in the morning shift, Rishi Bankim Chandra College, operating in the day shift, and Rishi Bankim Chandra Evening College, operating in the evening shift. They offer undergraduate courses in arts, commerce and sciences. The three colleges are affiliated to West Bengal State University.

History
Rishi Bankim Chandra College was originally established in 1947 by some noted educationists. It was housed then in Naihati Mahendra School building and as classes were held in evening hours, had the name Rishi Bankim Chandra College (Evening). In the following years Day Section and Morning Section of the College were added. Thus, the then Rishi Bankim Chandra College was born and within a very short span of time it drew the acclaim and attention of the public and academic of note. Following in on the trifurcation in the year 1984 of the parent body for administrative purposes, the present Rishi Bankim Chandra College for Women (Morning Section) and Rishi Bankim Chandra Evening College emerged as full-fledged independent units.

Departments

Science
Electronics
Chemistry
Physics
Mathematics
Botany
Zoology
Statistics
Ecology
Microbiology
Computer application

Arts and Commerce
Bengali
English
Sanskrit
Hindi
History
Geography
Political Science
Philosophy
Economics
Film Studies
Journalism
Commerce
 Accountancy
 Marketing

Library

Rishi Bankim Chandra College of Women
The college's Central library is located on the second floor of the new building on the eastern side of the campus. It is open from 7:30 am to 12:30 pm from Monday to Saturday.

The  online public access catalogue (OPAC) is accessible at http://rbccwomen-opac.l2c2.co.in

Accreditation
The three Rishi Bankim Chandra colleges are recognized by the University Grants Commission (UGC). They were accredited by the National Assessment and Accreditation Council (NAAC), and awarded B++ grade for the day college and the woman college, and C+ for the evening college.

See also
Education in India
List of colleges in West Bengal
Education in West Bengal

References

External links
 Official website

Educational institutions established in 1947
Colleges affiliated to West Bengal State University
Universities and colleges in North 24 Parganas district
1947 establishments in India